Petr Pohl (born August 28, 1986) is a Czech professional ice hockey player currently an unrestricted free agent. He was most recently under contract with the Grizzlys Wolfsburg of the Deutsche Eishockey Liga (DEL). He was selected by the Columbus Blue Jackets in the 5th round (133rd overall) of the 2004 NHL Entry Draft.

Playing career
Pohl played with HC Vítkovice in the Czech Extraliga during the 2010–11 Czech Extraliga season. In the 2016–17 campaign, with ERC Ingolstadt in the Deutsche Eishockey Liga, Pohl added 23 points in 37 games before suffering a preliminary playoff loss to the Fischtown Pinguins to conclude his tenure with ERC.

On April 7, 2017, Pohl signed as a free agent to a three-year contract to remain in the DEL with the Thomas Sabo Ice Tigers.

Pohl transferred to the Grizzlys Wolfsburg in 2018–19 season, registering 7 goals and 13 points in 28 games, before leaving as a free agent on March 8, 2019.

Career statistics

Regular season and playoffs

International

References

External links

1986 births
Living people
Acadie–Bathurst Titan players
Eisbären Berlin players
ERC Ingolstadt players
Columbus Blue Jackets draft picks
Czech ice hockey right wingers
Dayton Bombers players
Gatineau Olympiques players
Johnstown Chiefs players
HC Karlovy Vary players
SaiPa players
Syracuse Crunch players
Thomas Sabo Ice Tigers players
HC Vítkovice players
Grizzlys Wolfsburg players
Youngstown Steelhounds players
People from Kopřivnice
Sportspeople from the Moravian-Silesian Region
Czech expatriate ice hockey players in Canada
Czech expatriate ice hockey players in the United States
Czech expatriate ice hockey players in Finland
Czech expatriate ice hockey players in Germany
Czech people of German descent
Naturalized citizens of Germany